Sweet Smell of Success is a 1957 American film noir drama film directed by Alexander Mackendrick, starring Burt Lancaster, Tony Curtis, Susan Harrison, and Martin Milner, and written by Clifford Odets, Ernest Lehman, and Mackendrick from the novelette by Lehman. The shadowy noir cinematography filmed on location in New York City was shot by James Wong Howe. The picture was produced by James Hill of Hecht-Hill-Lancaster Productions and released by United Artists. The supporting cast features Sam Levene, Barbara Nichols, Joe Frisco, Edith Atwater, David White and Emile Meyer. The musical score was arranged and conducted by Elmer Bernstein and the film also features jazz performances by the Chico Hamilton Quintet. Mary Grant designed the costumes.

The film tells the story of powerful and sleazy newspaper columnist J.J. Hunsecker (portrayed by Lancaster and based on Walter Winchell) who uses his connections to ruin his sister's relationship with a man he deems unworthy of her.

Despite a poorly received preview screening, Sweet Smell of Success has greatly improved in stature over the years. It is now highly acclaimed by film critics, particularly for its cinematography and screenplay. In 1993, the film was selected for preservation in the United States National Film Registry by the Library of Congress as being "culturally, historically, or aesthetically significant."

Sweet Smell of Success: The Musical was created by Marvin Hamlisch, Craig Carnelia, and John Guare in 2002.

Plot
Morally bankrupt Manhattan press agent Sidney Falco is a frustrated fringe player who, of late, has been unable to gain positive publicity for his clients in media kingpin J.J. Hunsecker's influential, nationally syndicated newspaper column. Hunsecker is overly protective of his younger sister Susan, and seeks to derail her romance with up-and-coming jazz guitarist Steve Dallas.

In return for a failed promise, the bullying Hunsecker offers Falco the opportunity to make good by breaking the couple up. Falco is losing money and clients, and knows this crucial back-scratch could save his career. Sidney hopes to plant a rumor in a rival column that Dallas is a marijuana-smoking Communist, enough to get him fired from the jazz club where his combo plays. Hunsecker will then gain points with Susan by defending Dallas and getting his job back, with Falco counting on an overly prideful Dallas rejecting a tainted favor.

To get his dirt planted, Falco plans to blackmail a prominent columnist by threatening to expose his marital infidelity. Instead, the columnist chooses exposure over his journalistic integrity - which even his wife praises as his first decent act in years. Falco then bribes a second columnist with a sexual favor to be provided by a cigarette girl he has a friendly relationship with, misleading her into waiting for him in his bedroom only to arrive with the columnist - a new low, even for Falco. He flips her outrage by claiming he is doing it to help her career. The lies get printed and Dallas' jazz group is fired from the club.

As planned, in Dallas and Susan's presence Hunsecker theatrically gets Dallas rehired with a phone call, but Dallas still insults and denounces J.J. for his malignant influence on society. Forced to choose between them, Susan breaks up with Dallas in order to protect him from her vengeful brother. In spite of this, Hunsecker is so incensed by Dallas's insults - which he twists around to characterize as attacks on his loyal, patriotic audience - that he escalates things. Holding Falco's feet to the fire, he orders the shill to plant marijuana on Dallas then have him arrested and roughed up by corrupt police lieutenant Harry Kello, a move so dirty even Falco recoils from it. To swing him round, Hunsecker dangles three months of writing his column while J.J. takes Susan to Europe to forget about Steve.

It proves too much to resist. At the jazz club, Falco slips marijuana cigarettes into the pocket of Dallas's coat. Dallas is accosted by Kello outside the club and beaten so badly he ends up in the hospital. Falco then celebrates at a bar where, surrounded by his industry pals, he toasts to his favorite perfume, "success".

The festivities are interrupted when Falco is summoned to Hunsecker's penthouse apartment, where he finds Susan in her nightgown about to jump off the balcony. Falco stops her, then lectures her and calls her childish. Hunsecker arrives to find Falco and Susan in an outwardly compromising position in her bedroom, as Falco begins to suspect that Susan has set him up. Unable to talk himself out of what seems like a trap, Falco is brutally slapped around by Hunsecker. Livid, Falco reveals to Susan that her brother conspired to frame Dallas. Hunsecker then calls Kello and deems Dallas innocent and Falco guilty of planting evidence. Falco declares that Kello's beating will not stop him from making the whole story public and leaves. As he exits the building, he is caught in Times Square by the brutal cop.

Susan packs a bag to leave. Stopped by J.J., she explains that she indeed had attempted suicide, having considered death preferable to living with him, and that she is leaving to be with Dallas. A distraught J.J. then watches from the balcony as she walks past Falco's beaten form into the coming dawn.

Cast

Production
Faced with potential unemployment from the sale of Ealing Studios to the BBC in 1954, director Alexander Mackendrick began entertaining offers from Hollywood. He rejected potential contracts from  Cary Grant and David Selznick and signed with independent production company Hecht-Hill-Lancaster, enticed by their offer to adapt George Bernard Shaw’s play The Devil's Disciple. After the project collapsed during pre-production, Mackendrick asked to be released from his commitment. Harold Hecht refused and asked him to start work on another project – adapting Ernest Lehman’s novellette Sweet Smell of Success into a film.

Lehman’s story had originally appeared in the April 1950 issue of Cosmopolitan, renamed "Tell Me About It Tomorrow!" because the editor of the magazine did not want the word "smell" in the publication. It was based on his own experiences working as an assistant to Irving Hoffman, a New York press agent and columnist for The Hollywood Reporter. Hoffman subsequently did not speak to Lehman for a year and a half. Hoffman then wrote a column for The Hollywood Reporter speculating that Lehman would make a good screenwriter, and within a week Paramount called Lehman, inviting him to Los Angeles for talks. Lehman forged a screenwriting career in Hollywood, writing Executive Suite, Sabrina, North by Northwest, The Sound of Music, West Side Story, The King and I, and Who's Afraid of Virginia Woolf?.

Pre-production
By the time Hecht-Hill-Lancaster acquired Success, Lehman was in position to not only adapt his own novelette but also produce and direct the film. After scouting locations, Lehman was told by Hecht that distributor United Artists was having second thoughts about going with a first-time director, so Hecht offered the film to Mackendrick. Initially, the director had reservations about trying to film such a dialogue-heavy screenplay, so he and Lehman worked on it for weeks to make it more cinematic. As the script neared completion, Lehman became ill and had to resign from the picture. James Hill took over and offered Paddy Chayefsky as Lehman's replacement. Mackendrick suggested Clifford Odets, the playwright whose reputation as a left-wing hero had been tarnished after he named names before the House Un-American Activities Committee.

Mackendrick assumed that Odets would need only two or three weeks to polish the script, but he took four months. The director recalled, "We started shooting with no final script at all, while Clifford reconstructed the thing from stem to stern". The plot was largely intact, but in Mackendrick's biography he is quoted from Notes on Sweet Smell of Success: "What Clifford did, in effect, was dismantle the structure of every single sequence in order to rebuild situations and relationships that were much more complex, had much greater tension and more dramatic energy". This process took time, and the start date for the production could not be delayed. Odets had to accompany the production to Manhattan and continued rewriting while they shot there. Returning to the city that had shunned him for going to Hollywood made Odets very neurotic and obsessed with all kinds of rituals as he worked at a furious pace, with pages often going straight from his typewriter to being shot the same day. Mackendrick said, "So we cut the script there on the floor, with the actors, just cutting down lines, making them more spare – what Clifford would have done himself, really, had there been time".

Tony Curtis had to fight for the role of Sidney Falco because Universal, the studio to which he was contracted, was worried that it would ruin his career. Tired of doing pretty-boy roles and wanting to prove that he could act, Curtis got his way. Orson Welles was originally considered for the role of J. J. Hunsecker. Mackendrick wanted to cast Hume Cronyn because he felt that Cronyn closely resembled Walter Winchell, the basis for the Hunsecker character in the novelette. Lehman makes the distinction in an interview that Winchell was the inspiration for the version of the character in the novelette, and that this differs from the character in the film version. United Artists wanted Burt Lancaster in the role because of his box office appeal and his successful pairing with Curtis on Trapeze.  Robert Vaughn was signed to a contract with Lancaster's film company and was to have played the Steve Dallas role but was drafted into the Army before he could begin the film. Ernest Borgnine, contracted to Hecht-Hill-Lancaster since Marty (1955) was offered a role in the film but turned it down as his role was only seven pages long in the script. His refusal led him to be put on suspension from Hecht-Hill-Lancaster.

Hecht-Hill-Lancaster allowed Mackendrick to familiarize himself with New York City before shooting the movie. In Notes on Sweet Smell of Success, Mackendrick said, "One of the characteristic aspects of New York, particularly of the area between 42nd Street and 57th Street, is the neurotic energy of the crowded sidewalks. This was, I argued, essential to the story of characters driven by the uglier aspects of ambition and greed". He took multiple photographs of the city from several fixed points and taped the pictures into a series of panoramas that he stuck on a wall and studied once he got back to Hollywood.

Cellist Fred Katz and drummer Chico Hamilton, who briefly appear in the film as themselves, wrote a score for the movie, which was ultimately rejected in favor of one by Elmer Bernstein.

Principal photography
Mackendrick shot the film in late 1956, and was scared the entire time because Hecht-Hill-Lancaster had a reputation for firing their directors for any or even no reason at all. The filmmaker was used to extensive rehearsals before a scene was shot and often found himself shooting a script page one or two hours after Odets had written it. Lancaster's presence proved to be intimidating for numerous individuals involved with the production; at one point, Lehman had been approached to direct the film, but declined due to his fear of Lancaster, although Hecht maintained that Lehman had never been offered the chance to direct. Mackendrick and composer Elmer Bernstein both found Lancaster intimidating, with Bernstein later recalling, "Burt was really scary. He was a dangerous guy. He had a short fuse". Mackendrick decided to use Lancaster's volatility to work for the character of JJ, asking that Lancaster wear his own browline glasses, which Mackendrick felt gave him the presence of "a scholarly brute". Mackendrick smeared a thin layer of vaseline on the lenses, preventing Lancaster from focusing his eyes and giving him a perpetually blank gaze. Assisted by cinematographer James Wong Howe, Mackendrick intentionally filmed scenes with JJ from a low angle using a wide-angle lens and with overhead lighting directly above Lancaster, so that the spectacle frames cast shadows on his face.

Shooting on location in New York City also added to Mackendrick's anxieties. Exteriors were shot in the busiest, noisiest areas with crowds of young Tony Curtis fans occasionally breaking through police barriers. Mackendrick remembered, "We started shooting in Times Square at rush hour, and we had high-powered actors and a camera crane and police help and all the rest of it, but we didn’t have any script. We knew where we were going vaguely, but that’s all".

Musical score and soundtrack

Reaction
A preview screening of Sweet Smell of Success was poorly received, as Tony Curtis fans were expecting him to play one of his typical nice guy roles and instead were presented with the scheming Sidney Falco. Mackendrick remembered seeing audience members "curling up, crossing their arms and legs, recoiling from the screen in disgust". Burt Lancaster's fans were not thrilled with their idol either, "finding the film too static and talky".

The film was a box office failure, and Hecht blamed his producing partner Hill. "The night of the preview, Harold said to me, 'You know you've wrecked our company? We're going to lose over a million dollars on this picture,'" Hill recalled. According to Lehman, Lancaster blamed him, claiming that: "Burt threatened me at a party after the preview. He said, 'You didn't have to leave – you could have made this a much better picture. I ought to beat you up.' I said, 'Go ahead – I could use the money.'"

Variety estimated the film lost at least $400,000 on its initial run.

Although he and Hecht would fire Mackendrick from The Devil's Disciple for the same painstaking (and costly) approach, Lancaster was quoted as saying that he felt Mackendrick had done a fantastic job for Sweet Smell of Success and that it wasn't his fault the film lost money. He also believed that Curtis should have gotten an Oscar for his role as Falco.

Sweet Smell of Success premiered in New York at Loew's State in Times Square on June 27, 1957. Critical reaction was much more favorable. Time magazine said the movie was "raised to considerable dramatic heights by intense acting, taut direction ... superb camera work ... and, above all, by its whiplash dialogue". Time and the New York Herald included the film on their ten-best lists for films released in 1957. The film's critical reputation increased in subsequent decades. David Denby in New York magazine later called it "the most acrid, and the best" of all New York movies because it captured, "better than any film I know the atmosphere of Times Square and big-city journalism".

Sweet Smell of Success holds a 98% rating based on 45 reviews at Rotten Tomatoes.  At Metacritic it has a weighted average score rating of 100 out of 100 based on 5 reviews. A. O. Scott wrote in March 2002 for The New York Times: "Courtesy of Ernest Lehman and Clifford Odets, a high-toned street vernacular that no real New Yorker has ever spoken but that every real New Yorker wishes he could". Andrew Sarris in the New York Observer, again in 2002, wrote, "the main incentive to see this movie is its witty, pungent and idiomatic dialogue, such as you never hear on the screen anymore in this age of special-effects illiteracy".

Legacy
In 1993, the film was selected for preservation in the United States National Film Registry by the Library of Congress as being "culturally, historically, or aesthetically significant".

In 2002, Sweet Smell of Success: The Musical was created by Marvin Hamlisch, Craig Carnelia and John Guare. It was not considered a critical or commercial success.

In its "100 Years...100 Heroes and Villains" list, the American Film Institute (AFI) named J. J. Hunsecker number 35 of the top 50 movie villains of all time in 2003.

Filmmaker Barry Levinson paid tribute to Sweet Smell of Success in his 1982 film Diner, with one character wandering around saying nothing but lines from the film. In an early scene from Levinson's 1988 movie, Rain Man, Sweet Smell of Success is seen playing on television.

The Law & Order: Criminal Intent episode "Contract" is an homage to the film, with Mo Rocca playing a gossip columnist who is clearly based on J.J. (in both appearance and attitude) and other characters from the episode quoting the film's lines many times.

The titles of episodes two and three from the first season of Breaking Bad — “Cat’s In The Bag … ” and “. . . And The Bag’s In The River” — are a direct quote from Sweet Smell of Success, which has been described by the show's creator, Vince Gilligan, as his all-time favorite movie.

{|class="wikitable"
|-
! Publication
! Country
! Accolade
! Year
! Rank
|-
| [[Sight & Sound|Sight and Sound]]| UK
| Top 250 Films
| 2012
| style="text-align:center;"| 171
|-
| Empire| UK
| The 500 Greatest Movies of All Time
| 2008
| style="text-align:center;"| 314
|-
| The New York Times| US
| The Best 1000 Movies Ever Made
| 2004
| style="text-align:center;"| *
|-
| Films101.com
| US
| The Best Movies of All Time (10,059 Most Notable)
| 2013
| style="text-align:center;"| 124
|-
| Total Film| US
| 100 Greatest Movies of All Time
| 2010
| style="text-align:center;"| *
|-
| Time| US
| All-TIME 100 Movies
| 2005
| style="text-align:center;"| *
|-
| Entertainment Weekly| US
| 100 Greatest Movies of All Time (1999)
| 1999
| style="text-align:center;"| 49
|-
| rowspan=2| Entertainment Weekly| rowspan=2| US
| 100 Greatest Movies of All Time
| 1999
| style="text-align:center;"| 49
|-
| 100 Greatest Movies of All Time (Second Edition)
| 2013
| style="text-align:center;"| 100
|}

(*) designates unordered lists.

American Film Institute recognition100 Years... 100 Heroes and Villains -- #35 Villain (J.J. Hunsecker)

Home mediaSweet Smell of Success was released on DVD (Region 1) and Blu-ray (Region A) as part of The Criterion Collection in February 2011. The release includes new audio commentary featuring film scholar James Naremore, Mackendrick: The Man Who Walked Away, a 1986 documentary produced by Scottish Television featuring interviews with director Alexander Mackendrick, actor Burt Lancaster, producer James Hill, and others. James Wong Howe: Cinematographer, a 1973 documentary about the film's director of photography, featuring lighting tutorials with Howe, a new video interview with film critic and historian Neal Gabler (Winchell: Gossip, Power and the Culture of Celebrity) about legendary columnist Walter Winchell, inspiration for the character J. J. Hunsecker, and a new video interview with filmmaker James Mangold about Mackendrick, his instructor and mentor. There is also a booklet featuring an essay by critic Gary Giddins, notes about the film and two short stories introducing its characters by screenwriter Ernest Lehman, and an excerpt about Clifford Odets from Mackendrick’s book On Film-making, introduced by the book’s editor, Paul Cronin.

See also
 List of American films of 1957

References

Bibliography
 

Further reading
 
 "CITY LORE; The Bittersweet Smell of the Broadway of Yore" by Charles Strum, The New York Times, March 10, 2002.
 "That Old Feeling: Sweet Smells" by Richard Corliss, Time, March 21, 2002.
 "Alexander Mackendrick on Sweet Smell of Success" by Alexander Mackendrick, Film in Focus, June 16, 2008.

 External links 

 Sweet Smell of Success essay  by Andrea Alsberg at National Film Registry
 Sweet Smell of Success'' essay by Daniel Eagan in  America's Film Legacy: The Authoritative Guide to the Landmark Movies in the National Film Registry, A&C Black, 2010 , pages 530-532
 
 
 
 
 Sweet Smell of Success: The Fantastic Falco an essay by Gary Giddins at the Criterion Collection
 Essay on the film by Alexander Mackendrick
 Movies like Sweet Smell of Success at itcher Magazine

1957 drama films
1957 films
American black-and-white films
American drama films
American satirical films
Curtleigh Productions films
1950s English-language films
Film noir
Films about journalists
Films based on short fiction
Films directed by Alexander Mackendrick
Films produced by Burt Lancaster
Films produced by James Hill
Films produced by Harold Hecht
Films scored by Elmer Bernstein
Films set in New York City
Films shot in New York City
Films with screenplays by Ernest Lehman
Norma Productions films
United Artists films
United States National Film Registry films
1950s American films